Percy Howard Newby CBE (25 June 1918 – 6 September 1997) was an English novelist and broadcasting administrator. He was the first winner of the Booker Prize, his novel Something to Answer For having received the inaugural award in 1969.

Early life

P. H. Newby, known as Howard Newby, was born in Crowborough, Sussex, England, on 25 June 1918 and was educated at Hanley Castle Grammar School in Worcestershire, and St Paul's College of Education in Cheltenham. In October 1939 he was sent to France to serve in World War II as a private in the Royal Army Medical Corps. His unit was one of the last to be evacuated. Afterwards he was sent to the Middle East and served in the Egyptian desert.

Career
Newby was released from military service in December 1942, and then taught English Literature at King Fouad University in Cairo until 1946. One of his students was the Egyptian editor Mursi Saad El-Din.

From 1949 to 1978, Newby was employed by the BBC, beginning as a radio producer and going on to become successively Controller of the Third Programme and Radio Three, Director of Programmes (Radio), and finally managing director, BBC Radio. While at Radio 3, Newby is credited with increasing the amount of Classical music on the station without the need for controversial changes to schedules.

His first novel, A Journey into the Interior, was published in 1946. He then returned to England to write. In the same year he was given an Atlantic Award in literature, and two years thence he received the Somerset Maugham Prize. In 1947, John Lehmann published Newby's boys' adventure story "The Spirit of Jem" with 41 line drawings and a colour dust wrap by Keith Vaughan.

In 1972, Newby was appointed a Commander of the Order of the British Empire (CBE) for his work as managing director of BBC Radio.

In his obituary author, friend and colleague Anthony Thwaite states: "P. H. Newby was one of the best English novelists of the second half of the century."

Novels
 A Journey to the Interior (1945)
 The Spirit of Jem (1947)
 Agents and Witnesses (1947)
 Mariner Dances (1948)
 The Loot Runners (1949)
 The Snow Pasture (1949)
 The Young May Moon (1950)
 A Season in England (1951)
 A Step to Silence (1952)
 The Retreat (1953)
 Picnic at Sakkara (1955)
 Revolution and Roses (1957)
 Ten Miles From Anywhere (1958)
 A Guest and His Going (1960)
 The Barbary Light (1962)
 One of the Founders (1965)
 Something to Answer For (1968)
 A Lot to Ask (1973)
 Kith (1977)
 Feelings Have Changed (1981)
 Leaning in the Wind (1986)
 Coming in with the Tide (1991)
 Something About Women (1995)

Nonfiction
 Maria Edgeworth (1950)
 The Novel, 1945-1950 (1951)
 The Uses of Broadcasting (1978)
 The Egypt Story (1979)
 Warrior Pharaohs (1980)
 Saladin in His Time (1983)

References

External links 
 Information site for P.H. Newby
 "Memories of the First Booker Prize". P.H. Newby Literary Estate.

1918 births
1997 deaths
20th-century English novelists
Newby, Howard
Booker Prize winners
British Army personnel of World War II
Commanders of the Order of the British Empire
People educated at Hanley Castle High School
Royal Army Medical Corps soldiers